Palo is a memory resident multidimensional (online analytical processing (OLAP) or multidimensional online analytical processing (MOLAP)) database server and typically used as a business intelligence tool for controlling and budgeting purposes with spreadsheet software acting as the user interface. Beyond the multidimensional data concept, Palo enables multiple users to share one centralised data storage (single version of the truth).

This type of database is suitable to handle complex data models for business management and statistics. Apart from multidimensional queries, data can also be written back and consolidated in real-time. To give rapid access to all data, Palo stores them in the memory during run time. The server is available as open-source and proprietary software.

Jedox was founded by Kristian Raue in 2002 and developed by Jedox AG, a company HQed in Freiburg, Germany. The firm currently employs approximately 300 people. Kristian Raue's departure from Jedox was announced in June 2014.

Features
Palo for Excel is an open source plug-in for Microsoft Excel. There is also an open source plug-in for OpenOffice.org named PalOOCa (discontinued), with Java and web client also available from the JPalo project. Palo can also be integrated into other systems via its client libraries for Java, PHP, C/C++, or .NET Framework. It is fairly easy to communicate with Palo OLAP Server, since it uses representational state transfer (REST).

Starting in October 2008, Palo supports XML for Analysis and MultiDimensional eXpressions (MDX) APIs for connectivity, and OLE DB for OLAP interface which allows standard Excel pivot tables to serve as a client tool.
Starting September 2011, Palo supports SDX dialect of LINQ.

Palo also provides a web-based spreadsheet interface called Palo Web.

Architecture
Palo Suite is a tightly integrated framework consisting of: Palo MOLAP Server, Palo ETL Server, Palo Web (Palo Spreadsheet - Connection, User, ETL, File and Report Manager), Palo for Excel, Palo Supervision Server and the Palo Client Libraries.

The Data in Palo database is stored as a cube in the Palo MOLAP server.  The Palo Excel Add-In component is used as a service to communicate between the Excel and the Palo MOLAP Server.

Licensing
Jedox announced only commercial licensing is available since 5.1 version (2015).

See also

 MOLAP
 Business intelligence
 Performance management
 Comparison of OLAP servers

References

Additional sources
 Bernd Held, Hartmut Erb: Advanced Controlling mit Excel. Unternehmenssteuerung mit OLAP und PALO, m. CD-ROM., Franzis, Poing 2006,  (in German)
 Stefan Müller, Leif Mergener: Business Intelligence im Vertrieb auf Basis von Open-Source-Lösungen. In: Ronald Gleich, Andreas Klein (Hrsg.): Marketing- und Vertriebs-Controlling (Der Controlling-Berater Bd. 11). Haufe-Lexware, Freiburg 2010, . (in German)
 Palo Documentation - Documentation to Palo (pdf) in the download section of the website
 Online Knowledgebase Free Online Knowledgebase with full-text search and export as PDF functionality
 Feature Voting Tool Feedback/Feature Voting Tool
 b-eye network article - Open Source OLAP in the Retail Environment. John Hobson, February 2008

External links
 
 
 Palo project page on ohloh.net - Palo project page on ohloh.net

Online analytical processing
Business intelligence